The Outer Sydney Metropolitan Bus Service Contracts (OSMBSC) are contracts issued by the Government of New South Wales to bus operators in areas surrounding Sydney. These regions include the Hunter Region, Central Coast, Illawarra and the Blue Mountains. In 2016-17, 21.6 million passenger journeys were made on Outer Metropolitan bus services.

History

The OSMBSC was initially made up of ten bus system contract regions, OSMBSC 1 to 10. These regions were declared and appeared in the NSW Government Gazette on 1 August 2008.

Unlike the Sydney Metropolitan Bus Service Contracts which are put out to open tender, the government has indicated it does not intend to go down this path with the OSMBSCs, but negotiate with the incumbent operators.

Like the bus contracts in Sydney, a requirement of the OSMBSC contracts is that operators cease using their own liveries and adopt a standardised white and two blues livery as prescribed by Transport for NSW. This livery was first implemented from 2010. As of 2014, the transition to the standardised livery is ongoing.

Originally, regions OSMBSC 6 and OSMBSC 9 each had two operators. In 2013-2014, each of the operators in OSMBSC 6 and OSMBSC 9 were offered separate individual contracts, resulting in the creation of two new regions OSMBSC 11 & 12 from OSMBSC 6 and OSMBSC 9 respectively. This gives a total of 12 regions, with each region having one operator. There was no change of operators or takeover of services between operators. However, Coastal Liner (now Hunter Valley Buses) continues to operate some trips on routes 78, 80, 91 and 98 in Busways region OSMBSC 6.

All OSMBSC contracts were renewed between 1 July 2014 and 2 January 2015, including the Newcastle Buses & Ferries contract for region 5, which was renewed for three years from 1 July 2014. At the end of the three year renewal, region 5 was replaced by NISC 001, with Keolis Downer operating as Newcastle Transport taking over bus and ferry services from Newcastle Buses & Ferries in July 2017.

It was announced in July 2021 that OSMBSC regions 6 and 7 would be put up to tender. OSMBSC region 7 was put out to tender in September 2021.

Regions
The list of regions and its respective operators in the Transport for NSW or the eTendering NSW website. The information is accurate .

Hunter, Newcastle & Central Coast

OSMBSC 11 used to be part of OSMBSC 6, until it was created as a separate contract region. Its routes were formerly operated by Coastal Liner until it was acquired by ComfortDelGro Australia and its subsidiary Hunter Valley Buses on 1 August 2018.

NISC 001 used to be OSMBSC 05 until July 2017, and was operated by Newcastle Buses & Ferries.

Blue Mountains

Blue Mountains Transit routes were formerly operated by the Blue Mountains Bus Company until taken over by ComfortDelGro Cabcharge (now ComfortDelGro Australia) and its subsidiary Blue Mountains Transit in December 2014.

Illawarra

Premier Charters' region 9 routes were operated by Green's Northern Coaches, until taken over by Premier Transport Group in February 2015. OSMBSC 12 used to be part of OSMBSC 9, until it was created as a separate contract region.

Patronage

See also
 Sydney Metropolitan Bus Service Contracts

References

Bus transport in Sydney